Carsten Wicke is a Rudra Veena player of German origin who lives in India. He studied North Indian classical music with several master musicians since the 1990s, after learning western violin and vocal music as a child.

Musical tradition 
His journey into Indian music started while learning India’s popular percussion instrument tabla with the most renowned Tabla Maestro Pandit Anindo Chatterjee in Kolkata. Being fascinated by the old classical Dhrupad music Carsten met India’s legendary Rudra Veena Master Padma Bhushan Ustad Asad Ali Khan, whose musical family tradition goes back over many generations, including outstanding Beenkars (Veena players) like Sadiq Ali Khan, Musharraf Khan and Rajab Ali Khan. Ustad Asad Ali Khan accepted him as one of his few Veena disciples and taught him traditional Rudra Veena in Khandarbani Style. Alongside Carsten also studied Dagarbani Dhrupad with Ashish Sankrityayan, the current director and teacher at the Dhrupad Kendra in Bhopal.

Performer 
Carsten Wicke is today one of the few international rudra veena performers. His Raga presentation unites the meditative depth in the Alap (introduction) – the unparalleled fortitude of the Dagarbani Dhrupad – with the dynamic interpretation of the faster performance stages (Jor, Jhala), a distinguished characteristic of the Khandarbani style. Combining subtle melodic variations with complex rhythmical finger stroke techniques his veena playing creates a unique listening experience that is appreciated by Indian music lovers as well as by the international audience. .

Instrument making 
Being based in Kolkata, Carsten Wicke also develops and manufactures new veenas in collaboration with local craftsmen, not the least to counter the current shortage of instrument makers for rudra veenas in India.

Media 
As film‐maker, author and media producer he documents Indian music traditions, particular the old‐classical Dhrupad Music.

References

External links 
 Carsten Wicke website
 Performances of Carsten Wicke on YouTube
 Carsten Wicke on Facebook
 Carsten Wicke on Flickr

1970 births
Hindustani instrumentalists
Living people
Rudra veena players